Troubleshooter or Resolver (Haegyeolsa) is the debut studio album by South Korean boy band Shinhwa.  It was released on May 9, 1998, by SM Entertainment.

Background and promotion

The group first performed the lead single, "Haegyeolsa" (Resolver) on KM Music Tank. The second single from the album was "Eusha! Eusha!". Because "Eusha! Eusha!" was a lighter song in comparison to "Resolver", which was a dark mood song, it appealed more to the mainstream listener, and climbed up the charts quicker. Shinhwa released their third single,  "Sharing Forever", which charted fairly well as well.

Track listing
Information is adapted from the liner notes of Resolver:

Note: E.Mun is short for Eric Mun, Shinhwa's leader.

Music videos

"Resolver"

In the music video for "Resolver" (Haegyeolsa), Shinhwa can be seen wearing matching shiny yellow outfits, dancing on a swinging platform.  The storyline that follows the music video can be linked to the American movie, Terminator, with Seoul, South Korea being destroyed by a huge blast of fire.  A girl can be seen in the music video, walking with a man following her. As the music video progresses, the man shows the girl various clips and pictures ranging from the holocaust to even Marilyn Monroe.

"Eusha! Eusha!"
In contrast to their first single, Shinhwa's "Eusha! Eusha!", which was a remake of Manfred Mann's song "Doo Wa Diddy", was a bouncy song, with the members dressing in white and blue costumes. The music video was filmed near a beach, with the members dressed in the Los Angeles Lakers Uniforms with Kobe Bryant's jersey #8.  "Eusha! Eusha!" was Shinhwa's first bubblegum pop song, with the members showing a different side to them in the music video, from jumping around to playing in the water.

"Sharing Forever"

With "Resolver" being a dark song and "Eusha! Eusha!" a light-hearted song, "Sharing Forever" (Cheon Il Yoo Hoon) is considered a sad song. The music video features Eric Mun, the leader of Shinhwa, as a photographer, taking pictures in the park when he stumbles upon a blind girl. She becomes his model and he falls in love with her, only to accidentally kill her in a car accident, thus causing him to fall into depression and grief. The girl later returns as a ghost with restored vision, and visits Eric while he is sleeping. He wakes up, feeling her presence, and eventually embraces her.

Controversy
Although their debut album was a moderate success, Shinhwa was met with accusations that they were just a copy of another popular boy-band at the time, H.O.T, although the two came from the same entertainment company. Shinhwa were often compared to H.O.T., with some critics accusing them of just "trying to win over the hearts of H.O.T.'s fans."

Release history

Personnel
Information is adapted from the liner notes of Resolver:

Production
 Lee Soo-man – producer
 Yoo Young-jin – music coordinator
 KAT – recording engineer, mixing engineer, mastering engineer
 Kim Young-hoon – recording engineer
 Kim Ki-byeol – recording engineer
 Yeo Doo-hyeon – recording engineer
 Andy in Canada – recording engineer

Guitar
 Kim Seong-soo – "Resolver", "Sharing Forever"
 Kim Jeong-bae – "Kamsa"

Saxophone
 Lee Jeong-sik – "Sharing Forever"

Keyboard
 Lee Ik-seong – "Kamsa"
 Kim Myeong-jik – "Kamsa"

References

1998 albums
Shinhwa albums
SM Entertainment albums